Peter Knight (born 27 May 1947) is a folk musician, a former member of British folk rock group Steeleye Span. Born in London, Knight learnt to play the violin and mandolin as a child before going to the Royal Academy of Music from 1960 to 1964. The recordings of the Irish fiddler Michael Coleman inspired him to take part in Irish pub sessions. He teamed up with guitarist and singer Bob Johnson until 1970 when he joined Steeleye Span. The parting was short-lived, as Johnson himself also joined Steeleye Span in 1972. Since 2016, he has performed as a duo with Bellowhead founder and melodeon player, John Spiers.

Steeleye Span

Knight's classical roots were well hidden until he recorded "A Canon by Telemann" on the album Back In Line, multi-tracking with himself on this tricky baroque piece. In the mid-70s he was once secretly a member of The Wombles and appeared on Top of The Pops as Uncle Bulgaria, with Rick Kemp and Bob Johnson also in Womble suits. He left Steeleye Span in January 1977, when it started to look as if the band was about to break up. Knight teamed up with Johnson again to record a concept album The King of Elfland's Daughter (1978), based on the novel by Lord Dunsany. It included one song sung by blues legend Alexis Korner and another by Mary Hopkin. In 1980 he returned to Steeleye Span and appeared on every one of their albums since then up until Wintersmith (released October 2013).

He announced his decision to leave Steeleye Span at the end of 2013 on his website on 14 November 2013.

Feast of Fiddles
Some of the most accomplished folk fiddlers of England and Scotland joined together for a tour in 2001. An album of live performances from the 2001 tour was sold as "Feast of Fiddles" in 2002. The group has continued to tour annually since 2001, but describe themselves as "unsigned". They sell albums of live performances from previous concerts, but in a very restricted way. The CDs are available at the gigs or over the internet. They consist mainly of traditional English tunes, in varying combinations of solo, duo or band.

Other projects
In 1982 Knight joined "Moire Music" a free-jazz group led by Trevor Watts, while still remaining a member of Steeleye. Liam Genockey was drummer with the group, and would later become a member of Steeleye Span, when Nigel Pegrum left.
Knight's classical and jazz influences surfaced again in 1998 when he recorded An Ancient Cause and The Gemini Cadenza, multi-tracking with himself.
In 1995 he recorded an album with bass-player Danny Thompson, best known for his work with John Martyn.
Knight is concentrating on developing his trio Gigspanner which features himself on fiddle, Vincent Salzfaas on percussion and Roger Flack on electro-acoustic guitar. They play a blend of traditional folk and hot jazz with African rhythms. Their debut album, released in November 2008, is called Lipreading The Poet. It was named by The Wire magazine as one of the best 15 'Global' Albums of 2009. They are undertaking an increasing number of touring and festival commitments.
Knight formed Tanna with guitarist Kevin Dempsey and Tom Leary during the 2000s.
He appeared as a guest on Mostly Autumn's 2007 album Heart Full of Sky and performed as a guest at their album launch show at the London Astoria on 10 February 2007.
He appeared as a guest on The Lost Trades's 2021 album The Bird, The Book & The Barrel

Discography (excluding Steeleye Span)

With Bob Johnson
 The King of Elfland's Daughter (1977)

Solo
 An Ancient Cause (1991)
 The Gemini Cadenza (1998)
 Too Late For Shadows (2005)

With Danny Thompson
 Peter Knight and Danny Thompson (1995) Resurgence – RES108CD

Maddy Prior
 Ballads and Candles (2000)

With Chris Leslie, Tom Leary, Ian Cutler, Phil Beer, Hugh Crabtree and Brian McNeill
 Feast of Fiddles (2002) (recorded live in 2001)
 Nicely Wrong
 Still Live (live 2006)

With Gigspanner (Peter, Sacha Trochet, Roger Flack)
 Lipreading The Poet (2009)
 Doors At Eight (live from May 2010 tour)
 Layers of Ages (2015)
 The Wife Of Urban Law (2017)
 From Poets To Wives (2021) - compilation from the above 4 Gigspanner albums

With John Spiers
 Well Met (2018)
 Both In A Tune (2021)

With Gigspanner 'Big Band' (Gigspanner with Phillip Henry and Hannah Martin, aka Edgelarks)
 Live (live at Fairport's Cropredy Convention, 9 August 2017)
 Natural Invention'' (April 2020)

References

External links 
Official website
Feast of fiddles

1947 births
Living people
Musicians from London
British folk rock musicians
English fiddlers
British male violinists
British mandolinists
Steeleye Span members
Chrysalis Records artists
21st-century violinists